64 (sixty-four) is the natural number following 63 and preceding 65.

In mathematics
Sixty-four is the square of 8, the cube of 4, and the sixth power of 2. It is the smallest number with exactly seven divisors. It is the lowest positive power of two that is adjacent to neither a Mersenne prime nor a Fermat prime. 64 is the sum of Euler's totient function for the first fourteen integers. It is also a dodecagonal number and a centered triangular number. 64 is also the first whole number (greater than 1) that is both a perfect square and a perfect cube.

Since it is possible to find sequences of 65 consecutive integers (intervals of length 64) such that each inner member shares a factor with either the first or the last member, 64 is an Erdős–Woods number.

In base 10, no integer added up to its own digits yields 64, hence it is a self number.

64 is a superperfect number—a number such that σ(σ(n)) = 2n.

64 is the index of Graham's number in the rapidly growing sequence 3↑↑↑↑3, 3 ↑ 3,…

In the fourth dimension, there are 64 uniform polychora aside from two infinite families of duoprisms and antiprismatic prisms, and 64 Bravais lattices.

In science
The atomic number of gadolinium, a lanthanide

In astronomy
Messier object M64, a magnitude 9.0 galaxy in the constellation Coma Berenices, also known as the Black Eye Galaxy.
The New General Catalogue object NGC 64, a barred spiral galaxy in the constellation Cetus.

In technology

 In some computer programming languages, the size in bits of certain data types
 64-bit computing
 A 64-bit integer can represent up to 18,446,744,073,709,551,616 values.
 Base 64 is used in with Base64 encoding and other data compression formats.
 In 8-bit home computers, a common shorthand for the Commodore 64
 The ASCII code 64 is for the @ symbol
 The Nintendo 64 video game console and (historically) the Commodore 64.
Since 1996, the number 64 has been an abbreviation or slang for Nintendo 64 (though N64 is more common) along with the games Super Mario 64, Mario Kart 64 and more.
64 is used in the term Smash 64 which is used to distinguish Super Smash Bros. (the video game) from the name of the series Super Smash Bros.
The number of stackable items in Minecraft is at most 64.

In other fields 

Sixty-four is:

 Up to the year 1957, the Indian currency Rupee had 64 paise. Likewise, the Pakistani Rupee also had 64 paise up to 1961.
 In chess or draughts, the total number of black (dark) and white (light) squares on the 8 by 8 game board
 The total number of gems in a standard Bejeweled game board
 64 was the name of a former Russian chess magazine
 The code for international direct dial calls to New Zealand (+64)
 The subject of the Beatles song "When I'm Sixty-Four"
 The registry of the U.S. Navy's aircraft carrier USS Constellation (CV-64)
 The number of braille characters in the old 6-dot system
 The maximum number of strokes in any Chinese character
 Number of hexagrams in the I Ching
 Slang term referring to a 1964 Chevrolet Impala, often configured as a lowrider, a popular subject among early-1990s gangsta rap
 The number of classical arts listed in many Indian scriptures. They include: singing, dancing, painting, poetry, playing cards, making arguments, making flower garlands, etc.
 The number of the French department Pyrénées-Atlantiques
 The number of crayons in the popular Crayola 64 pack
 Number of codons in the RNA codon table under genetic code
 Number of golden disks in the myth of the Tower of Hanoi
 A number referring to Tiananmen Square protests of 1989 in Chinese
 "64" is the title of a song by the hip-hop group Mellowhype from their album BlackenedWhite
 Number of shares in a ship or boat under British Registry owing to its divisibility by 1, 2, 4, 6, 8, 16, 32
64 Zoo Lane, a British animated children's TV series

See also
 List of highways numbered 64

References 

Integers